Devendra Tamang (born 1 November 1993) is a Nepalese professional footballer who plays for Three Star Club and his country's national team.

In October 2015 at the final of 2015 Nepal National League, Tamang was awarded best defender of the season.

References 

1993 births
Living people
Nepalese footballers
Nepal international footballers
Three Star Club players
Association football defenders
Tamang people